Manaco is a village and seat of the commune of Kounari in the Cercle of Mopti in the Mopti Region of southern-central Mali.

References

Populated places in Mopti Region
Manaco is a French village